Shook Twins is a folk music group originally from Sandpoint, Idaho and currently based in Portland, Oregon, formed in 2004. The nucleus of the band consists of identical twin sisters Katelyn (guitar, mandolin, banjo, glockenspiel, telephone microphone) and Laurie Shook (banjo, guitar, tambourine, golden egg).

Their style of music incorporates acoustic instrumentation including banjo, guitar, mandolin, glockenspiel, and their signature golden egg. Twin harmonies layered on top of acoustic and electric instrumentation are coupled with Laurie's beatboxing and inventive use of a looping machine, and Katelyn's repurposed telephone microphone. The band members have performed with or opened for Ani DiFranco, Gregory Alan Isakov, Greensky Bluegrass, Mason Jennings, Carolina Chocolate Drops, Sarah Jarosz, Laura Veirs, Trace Bundy, Jonatha Brooke, Indigo Girls, Walk Off the Earth, Crooked Still, Jason Webley, John Craigie, Elephant Revival, The Head and the Heart, The Infamous Stringdusters, and many more.

They have toured coast to coast performing at festivals including High Sierra Music Festival, Oregon Country Fair, Hulaween, Northwest String Summit, Summer Camp Music Festival, Electric Forest, Lightning in a Bottle, Joshua Tree Music Festival, Arise Music Festival, Four Corners Folk Festival, Fayetteville Roots and more.

History 
Katelyn and Laurie Shook were born in 1984 and grew up in Sandpoint in the Idaho Panhandle. At a very young age, the sisters started singing, joining the choir in fifth grade which they continued in high school. They developed their musical repertoire and talent throughout their teen years and subsequently enrolled at the University of Idaho at Moscow in 2002 to pursue radio/TV/digital media majors. In 2004, they both took a year off from college and played their first paid gig at a restaurant. Soon after they secured a regular gig at a winery and established themselves as the "Shook Twins". The sisters played in and around Sandpoint and northern Idaho, releasing their first album "You Can Have the Rest" in 2008. Advancing their music career the twin sisters moved to Portland in December 2009, conceptualizing their 2011 release "Window." Kyle Volkman was an original member of the band joining in 2007 but left for a time and rejoined the sisters in Portland in 2009. Niko Daoussis (vocals, mandolin, guitar) formerly of The Bucky Walters joined the band as a full-time member in 2012 and often performs as his solo act, Cyber Cambel.

On April 6, 2012 an exclusive audio track "Hooks" was debuted on MTV Hive. "Hooks" was released on Shook Twins forthcoming album that was released in 2014. Shook Twins recorded in April/May 2013 with Grammy nominated producer Ryan Hadlock (The Lumineers, Milo Green) due out 2014 at his Bear Creek Studios in Woodinville, Washington. A new song/video premiere from their forthcoming album debuted on Relix on July 26, 2013. Katelyn and Laurie Shook's side projects include partnering with fellow Portland musician Ben Darwish with the group "Morning Ritual" on his folk Opera, "The Clear Blue Pearl." A recent Live Studio session from Oregon Public Broadcasting was featured on OPB's website. On April 5, 2018, Shook Twins debuted their latest single "Stay Wild" on Baeble Music.

In 2021, Shook Twins were reported to be appearing on the podcast Storybound.

Band members 

Katelyn Shook (vocals, guitar)
Laurie Shook (vocals, banjo)
Niko Daoussis (mandolin, guitar, vocals)
Aber Miller (keyboard, key bass)

Discography

Albums 
You Can Have The Rest (2008)
Live In The Shop (2009)
Window (2011)
What We Do (2014)
Some Good Lives (2019)

Singles 

 "Rose" (2011)
"Holler It Down" (2013)
 "Shake" (2014)
 "Thoughts All In" (2014)
"Hooks" (2014) 
 "Awhile" (2014)
 "Call Me Out" (2016)
"Mad Scientist" (2017)
"Safe" (2017)
"Shake" (2017)
"Stay Wild" (2018)
"What Have We Done" (2019)

EPs 

Live at The Triple Door (2013)
2 (2017)

Notes

References

Further reading

Interviews

Reviews

External links 
 
 

2004 establishments in Idaho
Musical groups established in 2004
Musical groups from Idaho
Musical groups from Portland, Oregon
Twin musical duos
American twins
1984 births
Identical twin females
Female musical duos
Living people
American musical duos